Michael Dempsey is an Irish former Gaelic footballer and manager. He played at senior level for the Laois county team.

Early life
Born to Jack Dempsey (originally from Laois) and Annie Spain (originally from County Offaly), Dempsey is one of seven children: the others are Martin, P. J., Seán, Betty (Moore), Margaret (Farrelly) and Ann (Smith), all of whom have links with the St Joseph's club.

Playing career
Dempsey captained his club St Joseph's to the Laois Senior Football Championship title in 1983. He spent many years playing for the laois county team and was part of the team that won the National Football League title in 1986.

Managerial career
As a manager Dempsey managed Laois to the Leinster U21 Football Championship title in 1994 and managed the Laois senior team in 1997 and 1998.

With the Carlow club O'Hanrahans coach, Dempsey led the Blues to three championships and a Leinster title (2000) in his four-year tenure.

He also managed the Muckalee and St Martins clubs in Kilkenny before joining manager Brian Cody as part of the leadership team for the Kilkenny senior hurlers in 2003.

Dempsey stepped down as part of the Kilkenny hurling backroom team in October 2019.

For the 2021 season, Dempsey was a selector for Loughmore-Castleiney in both hurling and gaelic football and helped guide the club to a second Tipperary double by winning the Tipperary Senior Football Championship and the Tipperary Senior Hurling Championship.

References

 Comhairle Laighean 1900-2000 Tom Ryall, 2000
 Complete Handbook of Gaelic Games Raymond Smith, 1999
 Laois GAA Yearbook 1999 Leinster Express, 1999

External links
Irish Independent article

Place of birth missing (living people)
Year of birth missing (living people)
Living people
Gaelic football managers
Hurling selectors
Kilkenny county hurling team
Laois inter-county Gaelic footballers
St Joseph's (Laois) Gaelic footballers